Ongnam Romtan Singh (born 21 August 1996) is an Indian professional footballer who plays as a defender for NEROCA F.C. in the I-League.

Career 
He made his professional debut for the NEROCA against Gokulam Kerala F.C. on 30 November 2019, He started match and was substituted in the 54th minute as NEROCA lost 2–1.

Career statistics

References

1996 births
Living people
People from Manipur
Indian footballers
NEROCA FC players  
Footballers from Manipur
I-League players
Association football defenders
Kerala Blasters FC Reserves and Academy players
Tata Football Academy players
DSK Shivajians FC players
Peerless SC players